No.1-class may refer to:

 , built 1941 – 1942
 , built 1941 – 1943
 , built  1942 – 1945
 , built 1943 – 1946
 , built 1943 – 1945
 , built 1922 – 1929
 , built 1940
 , built 1933 – 1936

See also